Gruffudd ap Rhys was Archdeacon of Brecon from 1345 until 1366.

References

Gruffudd ap Rhys

14th-century Welsh Roman Catholic priests
Archdeacons of Brecon